On 20 August 2022, at least 35 people were killed in two separate bus crashes in Turkey. Despite their similarities, they are reportedly unlinked.

Gaziantep crash 
In Gaziantep Province, a bus hit the scene of a road crash, crashing into cars and flipping over onto its side. 16 people were killed and 21 were injured. The incident occurred on the highway between Gaziantep and Nizip. Those killed included three firefighters, two paramedics and two journalists.

Mardin crash 
The second crash occurred in Derik in Mardin Province at another crash site. According to Minister of Health Fahrettin Koca, the crash "occurred after the brakes gave out on a lorry, which hit a crowd".

Investigation 
Minister of Justice Bekir Bozdag announced an investigation into the crashes.

References

See also 
 List of traffic collisions (2000–present)

2020s road incidents in Asia
History of Gaziantep Province
History of Mardin Province
Road incidents in Turkey
August 2022 events in Turkey
2022 disasters in Turkey
2022 road incidents